Edward Cotton may refer to:
 Edward Cotton (priest, died 1647), Archdeacon of Totnes
 Edward Cotton (priest, died 1675) (1616–1675), Archdeacon of Cornwall
 Edward John Cotton (1829–1899), English accountant and railway manager
 Ted Cotton (1929–2002), Australian cricketer
 Edward Cotton-Jodrell (1847–1917), known until 1890 as Edward Thomas Davenant Cotton, British Army officer and politician